Medukha may refer to these terms in Ukraine.

 Medukha, Ukraine - village in Ivano-Frankivsk Oblast
 Medukha - is a Ukrainian honey-based alcoholic beverage.